Rising Sun-Lebanon is a census-designated place (CDP) in Kent County, Delaware, United States. It is part of the Dover, Delaware Metropolitan Statistical Area. The population was 3,391 at the 2010 census.

Geography
Rising Sun-Lebanon is located at  (39.0998156, -75.5050260).

According to the United States Census Bureau, the CDP has a total area of 3.6 square miles (9.2 km), of which 3.4 square miles (8.8 km)  is land and 0.2 square miles (0.4 km)  (4.76%) is water.

Demographics

As of the census of 2000, there were 2,458 people, 829 households, and 669 families residing in the CDP. The racial makeup of the CDP was 75.71% White, 15.58% African American, 0.49% Native American, 2.36% Asian, 2.56% from other races, and 3.30% from two or more races. Hispanic or Latino of any race were 5.94% of the population.

There were 829 households, out of which 49.1% had children under the age of 18 living with them, 64.4% were married couples living together, 12.9% had a female householder with no husband present, and 19.2% were non-families. 14.5% of all households were made up of individuals, and 4.6% had someone living alone who was 65 years of age or older. The average household size was 2.97 and the average family size was 3.29.

In the CDP, the population was spread out, with 35.0% under the age of 18, 11.4% from 18 to 24, 35.3% from 25 to 44, 12.7% from 45 to 64, and 5.5% who were 65 years of age or older. The median age was 27 years. For every 100 females, there were 97.0 males. For every 100 females age 18 and over, there were 95.7 males.

The median income for a household in the CDP was $37,315, and the median income for a family was $40,658. Males had a median income of $27,031 versus $21,302 for females. The per capita income for the CDP was $13,868. About 4.1% of families and 6.6% of the population were below the poverty line, including 7.4% of those under age 18 and 2.9% of those age 65 or over.

Education
Rising Sun-Lebanon is located in the Caesar Rodney School District. Portions are zoned to Allen Frear Elementary School in Rising Sun-Lebanon while others are zoned to Star Hill Elementary School, in an unincorporated area. Both areas in turn are zoned to Postlethwait Middle School, also in Rising Sun-Lebanon. Caesar Rodney High School in Camden is the comprehensive high school for the entire district.

References

Census-designated places in Kent County, Delaware
Census-designated places in Delaware